Lee Kohse (born March 20, 1974, in Crescent City, California) is an American portrait artist best known for his work in the entertainment industry, most notably as an artist for Lucasfilm working on Star Wars projects and as a Partnered Creative Twitch Streamer. Kohse has also worked as a comic book writer/artist.

Early life
He attended Chula Vista High School from 1989 to 1992 with the comic colorist and fellow BloodFire Studios artist Jeromy Cox.

Bibliography
 Dark Tarot (artist) - BloodFire Studios (1999–2002)
 Kindergoth: Tiny Green Men (writer) - BloodFire Studios (2002–2003)
 Kindergoth: Cafeteria Havoc (writer/colorist) - BloodFire Studios (2004)
 Tenth Muse Vol 2 #10 (cover) - Bluewater Productions (2005)
 Tenth Muse Trade Paperback - Bluewater Productions (2005)
 Old Friends (covers) - IDW Publishing (2005–2006)
 Lord of the Rings Masterpieces (sketch cards) - Topps (2006)
 Shrek the Third Trading Cards (sketch cards) - Inkworks (2007)
 Aliens vs Predator Trading Cards (sketch cards) - Inkworks (2007)
 Heroes Trading Cards (sketch cards) - Topps (2007)
 Lord of the Rings Masterpieces II Trading Cards (sketch cards) - Topps (2008)
 Doctor Who Trading Cards (sketch cards) - Inkworks (2008)
 Indiana Jones (2008)
 Star Wars Clone Wars - Topps (2008)
 Indiana Jones Masterpieces Trading Cards - Topps (2008)
 DNA Hacker Chronicles, co-artist with Matt Olson - BloodFire Studios (2008–2009)
 But Not Gino, (Artist) - Blue Sneaker Press (2013)

References

External links

 
 Twitch.tv KohseArt live streaming
 Lee Kohse at the Comic Book Database

American comics artists
American comics writers
People from Crescent City, California
1974 births
Living people
Lucasfilm people